Spencer Brown is an English comedian, actor and writer from London. His style is surreal and contains elements of slapstick, absurdity and silliness. He is currently presenting The Sexy Ads Show on Fiver/Channel Five.

He co-hosted ITV2's Lip Service with Holly Willoughby, and acted in a number of notable television comedies including Nathan Barley, Man to Man with Dean Learner, and Garth Marenghi's Darkplace, as well as in London's West End. His stand up album, Things I Don't Have To Do, was released in the summer of 2006. He appeared on the fifth season of the NBC TV show Last Comic Standing. He was a member of the Cambridge Footlights troupe that included Matthew Holness, Richard Ayoade and John Oliver. He was also a founding member of the Alternative Alternative movement. In 2009, Brown appeared in 3 mobile's sponsorship bumpers for various Channel 4 comedy programmes.

Works

Discography
 Things I Don't Have To Do (2006)

Feature films
 Shed of the Dead

Short films
 Shop Idol
 The Shower

Television films
 The Roundabout (2011)
 Naked But Funny (2010)

Television series
 The Sexy Ads Show
 Last Comic Standing 
 Nathan Barley 
 Don't Get Screwed

Music videos
 She The Queen

External links
Official website
Official MySpace
Official YouTube page

References

English male comedians
English stand-up comedians
English television presenters
English male television actors
English writers
Living people
Year of birth missing (living people)